Adolph Joachim Sabath (April 4, 1866 – November 6, 1952) was an American politician. He served as a member of the U.S. House of Representatives from Chicago, Illinois, from 1907 until his death in Bethesda, Maryland on November 6, 1952. From 1934 to 1952, he served as the Dean of the United States House of Representatives as the longest-serving member of the body.

Life and career
Born in Záboří, Austrian Empire (now the Czech Republic) into a Jewish family, he immigrated to America at age 15, became active in real estate, and received his LL.B. degree in 1891 from the Chicago College of Law (now Chicago-Kent College of Law). He served in local offices including justice of the peace (1895–1897) and police magistrate (1897–1906) until election to Congress from the Jewish and Czech West Side in 1907. He was active in state and national Democratic party affairs, attending many conventions. In 1911, he received much positive attention in the Czech community in Chicago for his fundraising efforts in the search for Elsie Paroubek, and paid for the child's funeral when her body was discovered.

He was a leading opponent of immigration restrictions and prohibition. In the 1920s he denounced the prohibition factions, the Anti-Saloon League "and their allied forces and co-workers, the Ku Klux Klan fanatics." Every year from 1925 to 1933, he consistently submitted bills in the House of Representatives, to amend the Eighteenth Amendment and the Volstead Act to allow commerce in beer and wine. In 1929, he came to the defense of his large immigrant constituency by countering claims that they were responsible for the surge in criminal activity during the 1920s. "The bootlegging and gang killings...are not the by-product but the direct product of the Volstead Act, and the supporters of this crime breeding legislation must claim the new cult of American criminals entirely as their own."

As a leading Democrat he chaired the powerful House Rules Committee after 1937. He was an ineffective chairman, with a small weak staff, who proved unable to lead his committee, was frequently at odds with the House leadership, and was inclined to write the President little letters "informing" on House Speakers William B. Bankhead and Sam Rayburn.

Beginning on April 1, 1934, he was the Dean (longest-serving member) of the House and he served as Dean for 18 years, 7 months, and 5 days: the longest time any person had served as Dean until John Dingell passed him on August 8, 2013.

Sabath was an avid New Dealer and an interventionist who strongly supported war against Nazi Germany. It was Sabath who nominated a teenage (later Admiral) Hyman G. Rickover to the United States Naval Academy.

He died of pancreatic cancer on November 6, 1952 and was buried at Forest Home Cemetery in Forest Park, Illinois, near Chicago.

See also
List of Jewish members of the United States Congress
List of United States Congress members who died in office (1950–99)

References

Bibliography
James A. Robinson; The House Rules Committee. 1963.

External links

Sabath papers, with bio
Biographical Directory of the U.S. Congress
Memorial services held in the House of Representatives together with remarks presented in eulogy of Adolph J. Sabath, late a representative from Illinois

1866 births
1952 deaths
Burials at Forest Home Cemetery, Chicago
American people of Czech-Jewish descent
Austro-Hungarian emigrants to the United States
Jewish members of the United States House of Representatives
Lake Forest College alumni
Politicians from Chicago
People from Bethesda, Maryland
People from the Kingdom of Bohemia
People from Strakonice District
Democratic Party members of the United States House of Representatives from Illinois
Deaths from cancer in Maryland
Deaths from pancreatic cancer
Deans of the United States House of Representatives
Lawyers from Chicago